District 24 of the Texas Senate is a senatorial district that currently serves all of Bandera, Bell, Blanco, Brown, Burnet, Callahan, Comanche, Coryell, Gillespie, Hamilton, Kerr, Lampasas, Llano, Mills, San Saba counties and portions of Taylor and Travis counties in the U.S. state of Texas.

The current Senator from District 24 is Pete Flores.

Top 5 biggest cities in district
District 24 has a population of 798,189 with 596,939 that is at voting age from the 2010 census.

Election history
Election history of District 24 from 1992.

Previous elections

2020

2016

2012

2008

2004

2002

2000

1996

1994

1992

District officeholders

Notes

References

24
Bandera County, Texas
Bell County, Texas
Blanco County, Texas
Brown County, Texas
Burnet County, Texas
Callahan County, Texas
Comanche County, Texas
Coryell County, Texas
Gillespie County, Texas
Hamilton County, Texas
Kerr County, Texas
Lampasas County, Texas
Llano County, Texas
Mills County, Texas
San Saba County, Texas
Taylor County, Texas
Travis County, Texas